This is a list of presidents of South Korea by time in office. The basis of the list is the difference between dates; if counted by number of calendar days all the figures would be one greater.

Rank by time in office

See also
 List of presidents of South Korea

Notes

Korea, South, Presidents

Presidents